Tetracis montanaria is a moth of the family Geometridae. It is only known from south-eastern Arizona. It is found in aspen-coniferous forests on altitudes between 2,440 and 2,715 meters.

The length of the forewings 22–25 mm. Adults are on wing in early October (and possibly late
September).

External links
Revision of the North American genera Tetracis Guenée and synonymization of Synaxis Hulst with descriptions of three new species (Lepidoptera: Geometridae: Ennominae)

Tetracis
Moths described in 2009